This is a list of the number-one hits of 2005 on FIMI's Italian Singles and Albums Charts.

See also
2005 in music
List of number-one hits in Italy

External links
FIMI archives
ItalianCharts.com

2005 in Italian music
Italy
2005